Blessing Chebundo (born 8 October 1958) is a Zimbabwean politician, a member of parliament and a leading figure in the opposition Movement for Democratic Change (MDC). He rose to fame by defeating Emmerson Mnangagwa in a contest to represent Kwekwe constituency in the parliament of Zimbabwe in the 2000 parliamentary election. Mnangagwa, a heavyweight in ZANU-PF, was predicted to easily win the constituency, but Chebundo won the seat despite threats to his life. As an incumbent, he again defeated Mnangagwa and was re-elected in the March 2005 parliamentary election.

Background 
Chebundo is a founder member of the Movement for Democratic Change, a political party that was formed in September 1999. He has represented Kwekwe constituency in the Parliament of Zimbabwe since the watershed elections of 2000. Before the formation of the MDC, Chebundo had been the vice-chairman of the Zimbabwe Congress of Trade Unions (ZCTU) for the Central Region; he was also national treasurer of the Zimbabwe Chemical & Allied Workers Union from 1990 to 2000. He served as the MDC's secretary of health from 2001 to 2005 and has been a member of its National Executive Committee since 2006.

MDC split 
Chebundo initially joined the 'rebels', led by Welshman Ncube, that broke away from the MDC. However, Chebundo eventually rejoined the main MDC, citing the wishes of the members of his constituency in Kwekwe.

See also 
Morgan Tsvangirai
Arthur Mutambara

References 

1958 births
Living people
Members of the National Assembly of Zimbabwe
Movement for Democratic Change – Tsvangirai politicians